The 2014 Sparkassen Giro was a women's bicycle race in Germany. It was the fifth race of the 2014 UCI Women's Road World Cup season and was held on 3 August 2014. The race covered several laps through the city of Bochum. It was the 14th time the women's race was held and the first time that it was part of the Women's Road World Cup.

Results

World Cup standings
Standings after 6 of 9 2014 UCI Women's Road World Cup races.

Individuals

Team: 
Mountain: Alena Amialiusik
Sprint: Iris Slappendel
Youth: Elena Cecchini

References

2014 in German sport
Sparkassen Giro
2014 UCI Women's Road World Cup